Espoir d'Allen was a French-bred, Irish-trained racehorse who won the 2019 Champion Hurdle.

Background
Espoir d'Allen was a bay horse with a narrow white blaze bred in France by Bruno Vagne. He was sired by the Thoroughbred stallion Voix du Nord out of the AQPS mare Quadanse.

Racing career

2017/2018 season
Espoir d'Allen won the Bar One Racing Juvenile Hurdle at Fairyhouse and the Knight Frank Juvenile Hurdle at Leopardstown Racecourse in the latter part of 2017.

2018/2019 season
In his second season over jumps Espoir d'Allen won the Fishery Lane Hurdle at Naas Racecourse in November and the Irish Independent Hurdle at Limerick Racecourse in December. In January 2019 he took the Limestone Lad Hurdle at Naas. At Cheltenham Racecourse on 12 March he won the Champion Hurdle at odds of 16/1, coming home fifteen lengths clear of his nine opponents.

In August 2019 Espoir d'Allen injured his shoulder after rearing up and falling during an exercise canter. His condition deteriorated and he was euthanised on 23 August.

References

External links
 Profile at the Racing Post
 Career 1-2-3 Colour Chart – Espoir D'Allen

Cheltenham Festival winners
Champion Hurdle winners
2014 racehorse births
Racehorses bred in France
Racehorses trained in Ireland
Non-Thoroughbred racehorses
2019 racehorse deaths